Benchmarking, also known as benchmark hunting, is a hobby activity in which participants find benchmarks (also known as survey markers or geodetic control points). The term "bench mark" is used only to refer to survey markers that designate a certain elevation, but hobbyists often use the term benchmarks to include triangulation stations or other reference marks. They typically then log their finds online. Like geocaching, the activity has become popular since 1995, propelled by the availability of on-line data on the location of survey marks (with directions for finding them) and by the rise of hobbyist-oriented websites.

History

Many survey markers in the U.S. were set over 100 years ago.  There was a surge in creating these marks in the U.S. from about 1930 to 1955, in conjunction with the expansion of map-making activities across the country.

Sources of data on U.S. marks

In the U.S., about 740,000 benchmarks with the most precise elevations or coordinates (but only a small fraction of the existing survey marks) are listed in a database maintained by the National Geodetic Survey (NGS) and accessible online.  The majority of marks set by the U.S. Geological Survey (USGS), the Forest Service, the Corps of Engineers, cities, and states, and local authorities.  Cadastral (land survey) marks are usually not measured for the geodetic database.  The database used by Geocaching.com, the hobbyist website for U.S. benchmark hunters, is only a "snapshot" of the marks that the NGS had documented by the year 2000, and has not been updated since then.

Each NGS-listed mark has a permanent identifier (PID), a six-character code that can be used to call up data about that mark. Using a form for an internet query like this, the PID for the mark can be entered and a data sheet for the mark viewed. A datasheet obtained through such a query looks like this. There is also a website which uses Google Maps to show the locations (and PIDs) of marks in each individual state of the U.S. Specialized hobbyist websites (like Geocaching.com) FAQ and its Benchmark Hunting forum can provide more information.

Some of these marks have precise "adjusted" coordinates (latitude and longitude). The adjusted coordinates are precise to sub-centimeter accuracy, while others, typically true elevation Bench Marks, have only coordinates scaled from a map. Scaled coordinates, by contrast, were read from a topographic map, rather than being surveyed. Many are accurate to 100 feet but some are as much as 3,000 or 4,000 feet distant from the mark to which they refer, rendering a handheld GPS unit of little use in locating them. Most marks have clear "to-reach" descriptions, but some lack complete descriptions, or changes in the surrounding buildings, roads, or terrain over decades make the descriptions obsolete.  Marks may have been removed by construction or buried.

Useful tools

In addition to the survey data sheet for a mark being hunted, many hunters bring along a digital camera to take close-up and area pictures of the survey mark (a disk, a cross-cut in a rock, an old copper bolt, etc.). These photographs, as well as a current description of the mark by the person who finds ("recovers") the location of the mark, can then be uploaded to a website as proof of a find. Surveyors use the term "recovering" as a synonym for "finding" a mark. This does not mean that the found mark should be disturbed in any way. On the contrary—disturbing a survey mark in even a small way often destroys its usefulness to surveyors and others. In the U.S., benchmark hunters often file two different reports on marks they find. One, less formal, is made to the website at Geocaching.com. The other more formal type is made by more experienced and careful hunters to the NGS database itself and describes the mark's found/not found status, current condition, and updated directions to reach it so that others (particularly surveyors) can more easily re-find the mark.

Benchmark hunters also frequently carry a compass (to follow directions gleaned from the datasheet), a probe (like a long-bladed screwdriver) to search for buried marks, a trowel (or a small shovel) to uncover buried marks, a whisk broom (to clear away debris), and one or more tape measures of various lengths, used in taping out referenced distances found on the data sheets.

Handheld GPS receivers are often used to get within a few yards probable error of a mark that has adjusted coordinates. Metal detectors are useful for finding marks that have become deeply buried over time.  Use of several of the tools in combination is sometimes required, but many marks are set on the surface of sidewalks, buildings, walls, boulders, or monuments and can often be found without special tools.

Description of markers

Survey markers vary considerably from one country to another. In the U.S they are usually bronze discs about 3.5 inches in diameter. A typical disk is slightly inset into the top of a concrete pillar set vertically with its surface flush with the ground or projecting slightly.  Others are metal rods driven into the ground and possibly surrounded by a capped metal or plastic pipe that can be engraved and stamped like disks. Disks can also be set in rock ledges or boulders, and in the concrete of a large structure such as a building, bridge abutment, or the base of a tower. In the UK, the mark is usually carved into a wall, or on a metal plate set into a wall.

In the U.S., a survey disk is usually engraved with the name of the agency that placed it. The name of the mark (or the "station" it locates) is usually stamped into its surface, along with the date on which it was set (or re-set, since markers that have been destroyed, can be replaced). Disks marked with a triangle are known as "triangulation station disks", since they mark the position of the primary point used for triangulation (or map-making). Disks marked with an arrow are called reference marks (RMs), since they point (or "refer") to the principal station that may be located many feet away. A triangulation station often had two or three reference marks. Reference marks were set to enable the primary station to be re-established (or re-set) if needed.

Sometimes a survey mark is made much easier to find by the presence nearby of a witness post, a stake (or a small sign) driven into the ground, and used to draw attention to (and to warn against disturbing) the mark.

Care must be taken to assure that a found disk is the one described on the data sheet, so as to avoid false reports. A reference mark may be mistakenly reported as the station mark. A disk set in 1945 may be confused with a similarly named disk that was set in 1946 by a different agency, and so on.  A RESET elevation benchmark should not be reported as the original. Sorting out these differences and reporting them correctly is an important part of the hobby.

Typical locations

In the U.S., markers are often found at the summits of mountains, along ridge lines, or on bare rock ledges with commanding views, because such sites provided good vantage points for triangulation lines to distant points.

U.S. elevation benchmarks were often placed along rail lines or roads that provided good sight lines for leveling. All active and some abandoned railroad rights of way are private property, actively patrolled by railroad police.

A common location is the top level of the abutment of a highway bridge or its wing walls.

As part of triangulation networks, intersection stations were sighted. They are typically tall, prominent, and well-defined points like a smokestack, the peak of a water tower, or a church spire. However, many of these objects have been altered or replaced by similar nearby structures and no longer mark the original location, so careful identification is required.

U.S. benchmarks were commonly placed on public buildings, such as courthouses, post offices, city halls, and older schools.

Benchmarks are often located on private property, or access to them can only be achieved by crossing privately owned land, so permission is needed for access.

In the UK

UK benchmarks tend to be on the corners of pubs, churches, and other public buildings, as well as farm buildings, railway bridges, and private houses especially those near a road junction. However, any building may be used, as well as natural features such as a rock outcrop.

In the United Kingdom, trig pointing is a recreational activity similar to benchmarking. Searching for trig points is more popular than hunting benchmarks in the UK, but there is considerable overlap in participation. "Trig points" is the common name for "triangulation pillars". These are concrete pillars, about 4 feet tall, which were used by the Ordnance Survey in order to determine the exact shape of the country in a project known as the retriangulation of Great Britain, which was carried out from 1936 to 1962. They are generally located on the highest bit of ground in the area so that there is a direct line of sight from one to the next. By setting a theodolite on the top of the pillar, accurate bearings to nearby trig points could be taken. This process is called triangulation.

There are 6550 such pillars listed in the T:UK database. While most of them have fallen into disuse, about 184 of them are currently used in the Passive Station network. These are maintained so they can be used as accurately located anchor points for differential GPS comparisons, and are re-surveyed every five years to calibrate for any geological movements of the ground.

In Popular Culture 
The cartoon character "Marvin Marker" is based on a benchmark, and was created to help preserve benchmarking in 1960.

References

External links
Yahoo! Group devoted to the study of the Ordnance Survey triangulation network.
The benchmark hunting portion of the Geocaching.com website.
Live UK Benchmark Database, primarily focusing on flush bracket benchmarks
UK Ordnance Survey benchmark source database, not updated since 1975
UK Trigpoint Database
US benchmarks overlaid on a Google Map
New England Benchmarks web site
UK images of Benchmarks (mostly Gloucestershire)

Individual sports
Outdoor locating games
Surveying and geodesy markers